John Darwin  may refer to:

 John Darwin (statistician) (1923–2008), Government Statistician of New Zealand
 John Darwin (historian) (born 1948), British historian
 John Darwin disappearance case, British criminal who in 2002 faked his own death in a canoeing accident